Adelio Paul "Dal" Dozzi (10 December 1936 – 6 October 2012) was an Australian rules footballer who played with North Melbourne in the Victorian Football League (VFL).

Notes

External links 

1936 births
2012 deaths
Australian rules footballers from Victoria (Australia)
North Melbourne Football Club players